Johannes F. Linn is executive director of the Wolfensohn Center for Development and senior fellow of the Global Economy and Development program at the Brookings Institution.

Linn studied law at the Free University, Berlin, Germany. He received his training as an economist at Oxford University, England (BA, 1968), and at Cornell University, US (PhD, 1972).

Linn is a former World Bank vice president for Europe and Central Asia. He began his career at the World Bank in 1973 in the research wing focusing on issues of urban development policy. Using his nine years of research for the bank, he published Cities in the Developing World: Policies for Their Equitable and Efficient Growth and Urban Public Finance in Developing Countries, along with a number of articles on urban development and finance.

In 1978, Linn briefly left the bank for the University of Munster, Germany, as a visiting scholar. He returned to the bank’s East Asia Region to serve as country economist and senior economic advisor. In 1988, he published, with Amarendra Bhattacharya, a study entitled “Trade and Industrial Policy in the Developing Countries of East Asia” (World Bank Discussion Paper No. 27). Between 1988 and 1991, he served as senior economic advisor in the bank’s Development Economics Staff, as the director of its International Economics Department and as director of its Country Economics Department. He was appointed vice president for financial policy and resource mobilization in 1991 and became vice president for Europe and Central Asia in 1996. A collection of his speeches from this period were published under the title Transition Years – Reflections on Economic Reform and Social Change in Europe and Central Asia.

From September 2003 to June 2006, Linn was a visiting fellow at the Brookings Institution. Since July 2005, Linn has served as executive director for the Wolfensohn Center at Brookings. In this capacity he has been engaging himself in research and advisory work regarding issues of global governance, transition in Central and South-East Europe, the CIS and Turkey, on transatlantic relations, and on cultural heritage preservation. Since beginning at Brookings he has also served as Project Leader and Lead Author for the UNDP Central Asia Human Development Report and has edited, with Colin Bradford, Global Governance Reform: Breaking the Stalemate.

He is also the senior resident fellow at the Emerging Markets Forum.

References

External links 
 The Wolfensohn Center at the Brookings Institution
 The Emerging Markets Forum

Living people
Alumni of University College, Oxford
Cornell University alumni
German economists
World Bank people
Free University of Berlin alumni
Year of birth missing (living people)